VKP Bratislava is Slovak volleyball team based in Bratislava founded in 1946. VKP have won Slovak league 11 times, Czechoslovak league three times and Slovak Cup 7 times.

See also
Slovakia Men's Volleyball League
Slovakia men's national volleyball team

1946 in volleyball
Slovak volleyball clubs
1946 in Czechoslovak sport